Nightshift is a 2020 Philippine horror film written, cinematographed, co-produced and directed by Yam Laranas. The film stars Yam Concepcion and Michael de Mesa.

Cast
 Yam Concepcion as Jessie Pardo
 Michael de Mesa as Doctor Alex
 Mercedes Cabral as Nora
 Epy Quizon as Orderley
 Soliman Cruz as Orderley
 Ruby Ruiz as Head Nurse Bethany
 Mayen Estanero as Detective Jose
 Roman Perez Jr. as Detective Suarez
 Irma Adlawan as Jessie's Mother
 Caleb Santos as Jessie's Fiancé
 Joel Garcia as Elizabeth's Killer
 Karenina Romualdez as Doctor
 Brian Bamunuachchi as Shadow
 Jonjon Maceda as Shadow
 Maryanne Climaco as Shadow
 Lita Loresco as Mrs. Tabitha
 Sigrid Polon as Elizabeth
 Christian Villete as Billy
 Rafael Atun as Mr. Lazarus
 Jessa Mae Gajo as Nurse Gloria
 Shaider Vargas as Jairus
 Mico Akashi Dagaas as Jacob
 Antonio Adlawan as Homeless Man
 Mary Ann Tan as Woman with Miscarriage
 Liberty Galvez as Dead Chanter
 Red Musni as Dead Chanter
 Edith Monsanto as Dead Chanter
 Gerard Gevera as Jacob's Parent
 Jessica Nunez as Jacob's Parent
 Brenda Porcadilla as Crying Grandmother
 Sofia Nicole Mabalay as Daughter
 Isabel Tepase as Relative
 Regina Miano as E.R. Doctor
 Jackylyn Miano as Nurse
 Prince John Dale Pampanga as Nurse
 Coleen Que as Admin's Voice
 Lalaine Yulo as Voice at ICU Intercom
 Ariel Guevarra as Funeral Home Worker
 Albert Logacho as Funeral Home Worker

Reception
Nightshift received negative reviews. Critics cite the film's low scare factor resulting from the excessive use of horror gimmicks, implausible scenes and the lack of insight of the characters played by Yam Concepcion and Michael de Mesa.

References

External links

2020 films
2020 horror films
Filipino-language films
Philippine horror films
Viva Films films
Films directed by Yam Laranas